Gonzalo Pérez de Vargas Moreno (born 10 January 1991) is a Spanish handball player for FC Barcelona and the Spanish national team.

He participated at the 2019 World Men's Handball Championship.

References

External links

1991 births
Living people
Spanish male handball players
Sportspeople from Toledo, Spain
Liga ASOBAL players
FC Barcelona Handbol players
BM Granollers players
Expatriate handball players
Spanish expatriate sportspeople in France
Handball players at the 2020 Summer Olympics
Medalists at the 2020 Summer Olympics
Olympic bronze medalists for Spain
Olympic medalists in handball
21st-century Spanish people